Saya Aye (1872–1930) was a major painter from Mandalay of the Traditional School who took some of the earliest steps in Burma in modernizing and Westernizing his painting, both religious and secular. He had a major influence on the history of Burmese painting in the first decades of the 20th century.

Training and early career
Saya Aye received an early monastic education where his artistic talents were noticed and thus he was given training in art from the age of 12 from a professional Traditional artist. He later became an apprentice to the Mandalay painter Saya Chone (1866–1917) who had been a royal artist in Burma during the reign of King Thibaw, and learned Traditional painting by copying the works of Chone and Chone’s predecessors, the royal artists Saya Sar and Kyar Nyunt. However, while Saya Aye acquired an extensive background in Traditional painting, his style was partly Westernized from the outset because Saya Chone himself had been influenced by Western painting and had begun to introduce techniques such as linear and tonal perspective in his work, which were fairly new to Burma in the colonial period. Ultimately, Saya Aye stood on his own and opened up his own studio in Mandalay and began to make a reputation for himself with illustrations and art decoration for funereal ceremonies. It had been his dream to become a royal Traditional artist, but the dream was thwarted when King Thibaw and the Konbaung Dynasty fell in 1885 to the British.

Saya Aye’s first taste of fame arrived with the patronage of U Khandi, a hermit monk of Mandalay who was keen to preserve the habits, customs and values of the Konbaung Dynasty through the imagery of painting. Thus, much of the early period of Saya Aye's career was spent in documenting scenes of the old Burmese monarchy, and also painting many Buddhist works (scenes of the life stories of the historical Buddha and Jataka Tales) for pagodas and religious buildings in Upper Burma, especially on Mandalay Hill. It is said that he acquired broad knowledge of Burmese traditions and religious rituals through these paintings, was particularly adept at depicting royal articles and ornaments, and became, along with another painter, Saya Mya Gyi, the most acclaimed artist in the old Traditional painting genre.

Until a Western vanguard in painting swept Burma, after the Burmese painter Ba Nyan returned from training in London in 1930, Buddhist-inspired works of art heavily made up much of Burma's corpus of painting. In the late 19th and early 20th century, these Buddhist works were generally done on metal sheets, quite often zinc, and hung high beneath the ceilings in monasteries and pagodas. In some places in Burma, Buddhist work by Saya Aye can be found at locations such as Eindawya Pagoda, but the works there have been hanging open to the elements for almost 100 years and they are heavily damaged, the scenes almost unreadable. Many of his other works have disappeared, been vandalized, or deteriorated beyond recognition of subject matter.

Style
At least two of Saya Aye's court scenes of the Burmese monarchy (on zinc plates, dated 1918) have survived in good shape and both of them are startling. While Aye's teacher, Saya Chone, had begun to master Western techniques, except in the case of photographs of three or four portrait paintings, whose whereabouts is unknown, Chone did not exhibit much desire to depict human features realistically. In general, the portrait figures in Chone's paintings lack individuation, one face looking much like another, in much the same way that ukiyo-e painting in Japan does, without capturing a sense of a subject's true looks or personality. In Aye's two zinc court portraits, a great deal more personality is expressed, with a great brooding darkness and shadowing. In these works, he also exhibits mastery of sfumato.

Western painting
It is not precisely known where Aye picked up his more advanced skills in Western-style painting but they clearly did not come from Saya Chone. Aye had no known formal instruction in Western arts. It is said, however, that Aye studied Western painting from illustrations in foreign books, and this is probably true as acquiring such books in the colonial period would not have been difficult. The early Burmese painter Maung Maung Gyi (1890–1942), who traveled to London on his own in about 1906 and managed some education in Western painting there, is also said to have given Saya Aye instruction in Western painting after his return to Burma in 1908 or 1909. Maung Maung Gyi allegedly gave this instruction to Aye in exchange for instruction from Aye in Traditional painting, which was then still held in high regard.

Secular portrait works
In the 1990s, a number of surprising gouache and oil portraits done by Saya Aye were discovered in Burma, perhaps five or six pieces in all. These works were almost entirely secular in nature, generally portraits of high officials or wealthy persons, presumably commissioned, and they bear little resemblance to the work of Saya Chone. They were a dramatic break from the Traditional style, while also retaining certain aspects of Traditional painting in the appearance, particularly, of floral arabesque. The works borrowed many techniques from Western painting—anatomical accuracy of proportion, depth perspective, shading, foreshortening, and moody expressiveness of personality. Various Burmese art historians have argued whether the lines or coloring in the paintings are Burmese or Western, some critics adopting opposite views, attempting to analyze the works and disassemble them into their national (Burmese) or international elements. This is very difficult to do for the works are a smooth fusion of Burmese and Western painting and stand as an integral whole. In these works, Saya Aye, who had no real formal training in Western painting, took giant steps in creating an original expression in Burma.

Death and legacy
Saya Aye was a financially successful painter. When he was in his 50s, he suffered a stroke and became paralyzed and could no longer paint. He left his painting business to his two sons Saw Maung and Phoo Gaung. Saw Maung (1900–69) received extensive training in Traditional painting from his father and continued the family business of providing Traditional religious paintings for Burma.

Museum Collections
 National Museum of Myanmar
 Fukuoka Asian Art Museum

See also
 Saw Maung
 Maung Maung Gyi
 Saya Myit

Notes

1872 births
1930 deaths
People from Mandalay
Burmese artists
20th-century Burmese painters